This is a comprehensive listing of official releases by English band The Duke Spirit. The band has been active since 2003, having released five studio albums to date, as well as numerous singles and EPs.

Albums

Studio albums

Live
Dresden Live (April 2012)

EPs
Darling You're Mean (May 2003)
Roll, Spirit, Roll (October 2003)
Relieve the Distressed (16 May 2005)
Covered in Love (December 2006)
Ex-Voto EP (22 November 2007)
Kusama EP (21 December 2010)
Serenade EP (17 October 2016)

Compilations
50 Years of Dr. Martens: The Album (Compilation, 2010, contributed a cover of Sham 69's "If the Kids Are United")
Batman: Arkham City (Soundtrack, October 2011, contributed the song "Creature")

Singles

Guest Appearances
War Stories (Unkle album, June 2007, appeared on the song "Mayday")

Additionally, Liela Moss has provided vocals for
Brakes on their cover of "Jackson" from the album Give Blood (July 2005)
Archie Bronson Outfit on "In the Shadow of Love", the B-side of their single "Dart For My Sweetheart" (February 2006)
D. Sardy on the song "Giant" from the soundtrack to 21 (March 2008)

References

External links
Official website
BBC Collective, editor's review
Interview with Toby Butler of The Duke Spirit 2007 The Line Of Best Fit
Interview with Toby Butler & Liela Moss October 2007 The Line Of Best Fit
'Neptune' album review The Line Of Best Fit
The Step and The Walk Review
Live in-studio performance on KCRW
Review of Duke Spirit - Live At The Manchester Academy 3. March 2008.
Session tracks and interview on Rare FM

Discographies of British artists
Rock music group discographies